Kartavirya Arjuna, also known as Sahasrabahu Arjuna and Sahasrarjuna, is a king featured in Hindu texts. He is stated to be the ruler of the ancient Haihayas kingdom, with its capital at Mahishmati. He is stated to be the son of Kritavirya. He is described as having a thousand hands, and a great devotee of the deity Dattatreya.

Nomenclature 
Kartavirya is the patronymic of the king, by which he is best known; the king is also referred to simply as Arjuna.

Legend

According to the Mahabharata and the Puranas, the most celebrated Haihaya king was Kartavirya Arjuna. His epithet was Sahasrabahu. He was called a Samrat and Chakravartin. His name is found in the Rig Veda (VIII.45.26). He ultimately conquered Mahishmati city from Karkotaka Naga, a Naga chief and made it his fortress-capital. According to the Vayu Purana, he invaded Lanka and took Ravana prisoner. Arjuna propitiated Dattatreya and was favoured by him. Arjuna's sons killed sage Jamadagni. Jamadagni's son Parashurama in revenge killed Arjuna. Arjuna had a number of sons. His son Jayadhvaja succeeded him to the throne. Jayadhvaja was succeeded by his son Talajangha.

As per the Narada Purana (76:4), The Thousand Armed Sahasrabahu Arjuna was the incarnation of the Thousand Blade Sudarsana Chakra. He was born on the Earth in order to face the power of Vishnu in the contest with the Shaktyavesha Avatar Parashurama. In most accounts, Kartavirya is described as a righteous king, who eventually became egotistical. The kshatriyas of his age, on account of their war with the Bhargava clan over property, became unrighteous and began oppressing and slaying innocent Brahmins, etc. On this count, the Jivatma Parashurama (destined to be a future Saptarishi) was born with the God Vishnu's divine strength and power to rid the Earth of unjust rulers. Kartavirya was slated to be his prime opponent, as the mightiest king of that time.

In the Mahabharata Vana Parva, according to the story of Akritavana, Kartavirya Arjuna became drunk with power, despite all the boons he had acquired. He lost control of his senses and began to oppress humans, Yakshas and the very gods themselves. Kartavirya even had the audacity to insult Indra in front of Shachi. Around this time, other Kshatriyas too had become drunk with power and oppressed innocents for pleasure.

Arjuna once troubled Varuna and asked him if there was anyone equal to him in power. Varuna replied that only Jamadagni's son, Parashurama rivalled Arjuna. Enraged, Arjuna went to Jamadagni's hermitage to see Parashurama's power.

Encounter with Ravana 
Kartavirya is considered to be the contemporary of Ravana. The story goes that once when Kartavirya Arjuna was having a bath in the river Narmada along with his wives, he stopped the force of the river with his thousand arms from both sides. The teenage Dashagriva (Ravana), who was singing the hymns of Shiva and praying to him, made him lose his concentration. Enraged, he challenged the former for combat in which Ravana was defeated and was humiliated. Then, on the request of his paternal grandfather, Pulastya, Kartavirya Arjuna released Ravana.

The Vayu Purana states that Kartavirya invaded Lanka, and there took Ravana as prisoner, but later he was killed by Parashurama and Ravana was rescued from Arjuna.

Encounter with Parashurama 

The Puranas recount that Kartavirya Arjuna and his army visited a rishi named Jamadagni, who fed his guest and the whole army with offerings from his divine cow Kamadhenu. The king demanded the cow for the betterment of his subjects; Jamadagni refused because he needed the cow for his religious ceremonies. King Arjuna sent his soldiers to take the cow. As the conflict developed among the Jamadagni and the King, Arjuna lost his temper and chopped off the head of Jamadagni. When Parashurama (Jamadagni's son and one of the Daśāvatāras of Vishnu) returned to the hermitage, he was informed of the context by his mother. In revenge, Parashurama killed the entire clan of Arjuna and the King with a battleaxe given to him by Shiva, eventually killing all kshatriyas, thus conquering the entire earth. He enacted this wholesale eradication of the kshatriyas for 21 generations.

In another legend, Kartavirya Arjuna visited the hermitage of Jamadagni, and was received by that sage's wife Renuka with all respect; but he made an ill return for her hospitality, and carried off by violence "the calf of the milch-cow of the sacred oblation." For this outrage Parashurama cut off his thousand arms and killed him.

In another legend, Kartavirya sent seventeen Akshauhinis to fight against the alone Parashurama who was on foot. Parshurama single-handedly slew the entire army and spared no one alive. Kartavirya arrived in his divine golden chariot which could go anywhere unobstructed. The King himself was a powerful archer, capable of simultaneously wielding five hundred bows and shooting five hundred arrows at a time. Parashurama broke Arjuna's bows, slew his horses and charioteer and destroyed the chariot itself with his arrows.

Arjuna hurled many weapons, rocks and trees at Parashurama, but the sage parried all these. Parashurama hacked off his thousand arms with his arrows and dismembered him with his axe.

In another place a different character is given to him, and more in accordance with his behavior at Jamadagni's hut. "He oppressed both men and gods," so that the latter appealed to Vishnu for succor. That God then came down to the earth as Parashurama for the special purpose of killing him.

Origin of Vrishala Kshatriyas 

The Ocean said, If thou hast heard, O king, of the great Rishi Jamadagni, his son is competent to duly receive thee as a guest.--Then that king proceeded, filled with great wrath. Arrived at that retreat, he found Rama himself. With his kinsmen he began to do many acts that were hostile to Rama, and caused much trouble to that high-souled hero. Then the energy, which was immeasurable of Rama blazed forth, burning the troops of the foe, O lotus-eyed one. Taking up his battle-axe, Rama suddenly put forth his power, and hacked that thousand-armed hero, like a tree of many branches. Beholding him slain and prostrated on the earth, all his kinsmen, uniting together, and taking up their darts, rushed at Rama, who was then seated, from all sides. Rama also, taking up his bow and quickly ascending on his car, shot showers of arrows and chastised the army of the king. Then, some of the Kshatriyas, afflicted with the terror of Jamadagni's son, entered mountain-fastnesses, like deer afflicted by the lion. Of them that were unable, through fear of Rama, to discharge the duties ordained for their order, the progeny became Vrishalas owing to their inability to find Brahmanas. In this way Dravidas and Abhiras and Pundras, together with the Savaras, became Vrishalas through those men who had Kshatriya duties assigned to them (in consequence of their birth), falling away (from those duties). Then the Kshatriyas that were begotten by.

Later on, as Patanjali's Aṣṭādhyāyī mentions, Abhiras appear in 150 BC. Later on, Abhiras established the Traikutaka dynasty with kings such as Ishwarsena, Indradutta, Dahrasena & Vyaghrasena. Dahrasena even performed Ashwamedha Yagya. Traikutikas were known for their Vaishnava faith, who claimed to be Yadava of Haiheya branch. Later on, in 10th century, Chudasamas are mentioned as the Abhira Ranaka, in Hemachandra's reference to Graharipu in Dvyashraya. Merutunga claims in his prose that Abhira Ranaka, Navaghana defeated Jayasimha eleven times, but Jayasimha went himself twelfth time after capturing newly fortified Vardhamanapura (now Wadhwan).

Outside Indian subcontinent

Indonesia

In Indonesia version, especially in Javanese wayang, Kartavirya Arjuna (Indonesian: Kartawirya Arjuna ) is called by the name of Prabu Arjuna Sasrabahu. He is told as the son of Kartawirya and still a descendant of Batara Surya. His grandfather, Herriya, was the founder of the Mahespati Kingdom.  Herriya has a sister named Resi Wisageni who has two sons named Suwandagni and Jamadagni.  Suwandagni had sons named Sumantri and Sukasrana, while Jamadagni had sons named Ramabargawa (Parasurama). Thus, between Arjuna and Parasurama there is still a cousin relationship.

The Javanese version of Arjuna Sasrabahu is considered an avatar of Lord Vishnu. He ruled justly and wisely in the Mahespati Kingdom. His wife named Citrawati daughter of the Kingdom of Magadha. The person who was assigned to propose to the daughter was Sumantri. This success had made Sumantri forget herself. He also challenges Arjuna if he wants to take Citrawati as a wife, he must take it himself. After going through an exciting battle, Sumantri finally admitted defeat. Arjuna was willing to forgive as long as Sumantri could move Sriwedari Park from Mount Untarayana into Mahespati's palace. Sumantri managed to fulfill this request thanks to the help of her younger brother, Sukasrana. Arjuna who was very happy decided to appoint Sumantri as governor with the title Suwanda.

One day Arjuna went on an excursion with his wife in a river. He did triwikrama changing his form into a very large giant and while lying on the dam the flow of the river created a pond as a bathing place for Citrawati. As a result, the river overflowed to flood the camp of Ravana king of Alengka who was on his way to expand the colony. Then there was a battle between the Alengka troops against Mahespati. Because Citrawati is the reincarnation of Widawati, the woman Ravana loves, Hwana is increasingly eager to crush Mahespati's army. After Suwanda died in the battle, Arjuna Sasrabahu woke up from his sleep and immediately attacked Ravana. Arjuna managed to defeat Ravana, then tied him with chains and dragged him using a chariot. Seeing the torture, Batara Narada came down to deliver a message from heaven for Arjuna to release Ravana because the giant king was not destined to die. Arjuna also freed Ravana on the condition that he should stop spit out his anger. Ravana agreed, and from that moment he became a vassal of Arjuna Sasrabahu. With various tricks Ravana tried to eliminate Arjuna to launch his greedy act again and marry Citrawati.

One day when Arjuna was hunting alone in the forest to entertain himself, Ravana came to report to Citrawati that her husband had died in an accident. Despite Ravana's plan, Citrawati actually defended her starch by plunging into the fire. Upon hearing of his wife's death, Arjuna became even more sad. In this situation Batara Vishnu left Arjuna's body to return to heaven. Arjuna who had lost his passion for life, went to abandon his kingdom. On the way he met Ramabargawa alias Parasurama, his cousin. The valiant Brahmin wandered in search of the perfect death. Apparently he had received divine instructions that he could enter heaven if he died at the hands of Vishnu's incarnation through a fight.

Seeing a good opportunity, Ramabargawa also challenged Arjuna Sasrabahu. Arjuna who was no longer passionate about life was finally killed by Ramabargawa's ax. Batara Narada descended from heaven to explain to Ramabargawa that Vishnu had long since left Arjuna's body. Later, Vishnu will reappear as a prince from the Ayodhya Kingdom named Sri Rama. This character will later lead Ramabargawa to his death.

References

External links 
 
Kisari Mohan Ganguli, The Mahabharata of Krishna-Dwaipayana Vyasa Translated into English Prose, 1883–1896.

Characters in Hindu mythology
Characters in the Mahabharata
Characters in the Ramayana
Mythological kings